Karaağaç ("elm", literally "dark tree"), also spelled Qaraağac or Karaagach or Qarağac, is a Turkic place name and may refer to:

Places

Turkey
 Karaağaç, Adıyaman
 Karaağaç, Biga
 Karaağaç, Bilecik
 Karaağaç, Bozüyük
 Karaağaç, Çorum
 Karaağaç, Çubuk
 Karaağaç, Daday
 Karaağaç, Edirne
 Karaağaç, Emirdağ
 Karaağaç, Gölpazarı
 Karaağaç, Gömeç
 Karaağaç, Hatay
 Karaağaç, Hınıs
 Karaağaç, İpsala
 Karaağaç, İscehisar
 Karaağaç, İskilip
 Karaağaç, Koçarlı
 Karaağaç, Kumluca
 Karaağaç, Kızılcahamam
 Karaağaç, Kulp
 Karaağaç, Orta
 Karaağaç, Seben
 Karaağaç, Suluova
 Karaağaç, Tekirdağ
 Karaağaç, Şavşat
 Karaağaç railway station

Azerbaijan
 Qaraağac, Jalilabad
 Qaraağac, Jabrayil
 Qaraağac, Nakhchivan
 Qaraağac, Sabirabad
 Qarağac, Qubadli

Other
 Karaagach (river), a river in Bulgaria
 Karaağaç, former name of Levski, Pleven Province in Bulgaria
 Karaağaç, former name of Ptelea, Evros in Greece
 Karaagach, Iran, a village in East Azerbaijan Province, Iran
 Karaağaç, Turkish name of Charkeia in Cyprus

See also
Qarah Aghaj (disambiguation), places with the name in Iran